The Supreme Court Bar Association(SCBAP) is an association established in 1989 comprising the supreme court  lawyers in Pakistan. The Legal Practitioners and Bar Councils Act 1973 provides for the forming, recognition and functioning of Bar Associations for supreme court lawyers working  under the control of Pakistan Bar Council. It is an independent Bar association whose aim is to uphold the rule of law and the cause of justice and protect and promote the interest of the legal profession as well as that of the public.

The Rules of the Supreme Court Bar Association of Pakistan, 1989 provide the detailed provisions for elections, meetings, its committees, disciplinary proceedings, powers and functions of the executive committee of the Bar Association etc. The SCBAP has 22 members, who are elected annually to manage the affairs and execute the functions of the SCBAP. The Executive Committee consisting of the President, Four Vice-Presidents (one from each Province), Secretary and Additional Secretary, Finance Secretary from Islamabad. Fourteen executive members elected from throughout Pakistan (at least two from each Province) by way of balloting.

Notable Presidents 
Abid Hassan Minto
Akram Sheikh
Hamid Khan
Justice Tariq Mahmood
Malik Mohammad Qayyum
Ali Ahmad Kurd
Aitzaz Ahsan
Munir A. Malik
Qazi Anwar
Asma Jahangir
Asrar-ul-Haq Mian
Kamran Murtaza
 Rasheed A Rizvi
 Syed Ali Zafar
 Amanullah Kanrani
Latif Afridi

Notable Secretaries
 Ali Akbar Qureshi
 M A Zafar
 Aftab Bajwa
 Aslam Zar
 Ameen Javaid
 Asad Manzoor Butt
 Shamim ur Rahman Malik
 Muqtadir Akhtar Shabbir

See also
 Pakistan Bar Council
 Punjab Bar Council
 Lahore High Court Bar Association

References

External links
 Supreme Court Bar Association of Pakistan

Supreme Court Bar Association of Pakistan
Bar Councils in Pakistan
Supreme Court of Pakistan
Bar associations of Asia